Paul David Wiggin (born November 18, 1934) is a former American football player and coach who currently serves as the senior consultant for pro personnel with the Minnesota Vikings.

After graduating from Stanford University in 1957, he spent his entire 11-year playing career as a defensive end with the Cleveland Browns until his retirement following the 1967 NFL season.  Twice earning Pro Bowl honors, Wiggin was a key member of the team's defensive line when it won the 1964 National Football League title with a 27–0 shutout of the Baltimore Colts.

He was named an assistant coach with the San Francisco 49ers on February 14, 1968, spending the next seven seasons with the team until being hired as head coach of the Kansas City Chiefs on January 23, 1975. After compiling an 11–24 mark in less than three seasons, Wiggin was fired following a 44–7 loss against his old team, the Browns, on October 30, 1977.

After Dick Nolan was named as head coach of the New Orleans Saints in 1978, he once again hired Wiggin as the team's defensive coordinator.  Spending two years in the position, Wiggin then was hired as head coach at his alma mater, Stanford, on February 1, 1980.

Despite the presence of quarterback John Elway on the team during his first three years, Wiggin was unable to lead Stanford to a bowl game during his tenure and was dismissed following the 1983 season with a 16–28 record over four years.  Wiggin's efforts to reach a bowl game had come agonizingly close in 1982, when his team fell victim to what simply became known as The Play on November 20.  In an incredible finish against the University of California, the school's arch-rival, Cal lateraled five times in the closing seconds to score the winning touchdown.

Head coaching record

College

References

External links
 
 

1934 births
Living people
American football defensive ends
Cleveland Browns players
Kansas City Chiefs head coaches
Minnesota Vikings executives
New Orleans Saints coaches
San Francisco 49ers coaches
Stanford Cardinal football players
National Football League defensive coordinators
College Football Hall of Fame inductees
Eastern Conference Pro Bowl players
Sportspeople from Modesto, California
People from San Joaquin County, California
Players of American football from California